Erik Winnberg (22 July 1895 in Östersund, Jämtland – 5 May 1981) was a Swedish cross-country skier who competed in the 1924 Winter Olympics.

In 1924 he finished tenth in the 18 km event.

Cross-country skiing results

Olympic Games

External links
 Cross-country skiing 1924 

1895 births
1981 deaths
People from Östersund
Cross-country skiers from Jämtland County
Swedish male cross-country skiers
Olympic cross-country skiers of Sweden
Cross-country skiers at the 1924 Winter Olympics